Yujiulü Chounu (pinyin: Yùjiǔlǘ Chǒunú) (?–520) was ruler of the Rouran (508–520) with the title of Douluofubadoufa Khagan (豆羅伏跋豆伐可汗).

Reign 
He was firstborn son of Yujiulü Futu and he succeeded his father when he was killed in a battle against Gaoche. This was when Gaochang king Qu Jia (麴嘉) rebelled against Rouran and resubmitted to Gaoche.

In the summer of 510 he sent the Wei court to the Buddhist monk Hong Xuan (洪宣), who presented the Emperor Xuanwu with a statue inlaid with pearls. As an answer, Xuanwu decided to send general Ma Yishu (馬義舒) as an envoy in 514, however Xuanwu died soon after decision, therefore embassy was cancelled. This time Chounu switched sides and sent his envoy Qijin Bijian (俟斤比建) to Liang Dynasty same year.

In 516, he marched on Gaoche in order to avenge his father. This campaign was a success, Gaoche leader Mietu was arrested and in reprisal towed to death by a horse. Moved by his success, he immediately sent his envoys Qijin Bijian, Hexi Wuiliba and Gong Guli (鞏顧礼) to neighboring Northern Wei and Liang with gifts. Another tribute composed of 700 slaves was sent to Wei court in 519.

Family life and death 
Soon, Chounu began having problems in family life. His infant brother Zuhui disappeared from the headquarters and no one could find him. Khagan was very worried. The twenty-year-old shamaness Dauhun Diwan appeared, who announced that Zuhui was taken alive by spirits to heaven and can be returned. Khagan ordered a seven-day prayer service and, unexpectedly, Zuhui ran into his yurt and said that he had been living in heaven for a year. Chounu was happy and ordered Diwan to divorce her husband Fusheng (he was given 3,000 horses and bulls) and made her his wife. Soon Chounu fell in love with her and ceased to deal with management affairs. When Zuhui grew up, Dowager Khatun Hou Luling (侯呂陵) found out that the story of heaven was invented by Diwan, and Zuhui lived in her yurt for all these days. Chouni did not believe this and soon Divan persuaded him to execute Zuhui. While Dowager Khatun Houluilin ordered his servants to strangle Dawhun Diwan. Moreover, unexpectedly, the Gaoche attacked and defeated the Rourans. Chounu decided to return to the headquarters and execute the murderers of his wife, but on the orders of the his mother Chounu was executed by the princes as well, who put his younger brother Anagui on the throne in 520.

References

Sources 

History of the Northern Dynasties, vol. 86.
Book of Wei, vol. 103

 

Khagans of the Rouran